Arenaria humifusa is a species of flowering plant belonging to the family Caryophyllaceae.

Its native range is Subarctic to Northeastern Canada.

References

humifusa